The Guldbagge for Best Art Direction is a Swedish film award presented annually by the Swedish Film Institute (SFI) as part of the Guldbagge Awards (Swedish: "Guldbaggen") to art directors working in the Swedish motion picture industry.

Winners and nominees 
Each Guldbagge Awards ceremony is listed chronologically below along with the winner of the Guldbagge Award for Best Art Direction and the film associated with the award. In the columns under the winner of each award are the other nominees for best art direction.

2010s

2020s

See also 
 Academy Award for Best Production Design
 BAFTA Award for Best Production Design
 Critics' Choice Movie Award for Best Art Direction

References

External links 
  
  
 

2011 establishments in Sweden
Awards established in 2011
Awards for best art direction
Art Direction
Art Direction